Miguel Lino de Ezpeleta (sometimes spelled as de Espeleta) (Manila, June 1701 – Cebu, July 1771) was a Spanish criollo born in Manila who served as the Bishop of Cebu from 1757 until his death in 1771. Consequently, he assumed the position as the governor-general from 1759 to 1761 during Spanish intervention to the Seven Years' War and prelude to the occupations of Manila and Cavite.

Life and succession
Miguel Lino de Ezpeleta was born in Manila in 1701. Though he was born to Spanish parents, he was often considered a Filipino rather than a Criollo. During Spanish colonial days, a criollo was a natural Spaniard born in the colonies.

On July 18, 1757, he was appointed as the bishop of the Diocese of Cebu (now an archdiocese) and about a year later, he was ordained by the Archbishop of Nueva Cáceres Manuel de Matos to the bishopric.

Upon the death of Governor-General Pedro Manuel de Arandía Santisteban in 1759, the See of Manila and the See of Nueva Segovia were vacant, and de Ezpeleta as the Bishop of Cebu was the senior prelate of the islands. He assumed the post of governor against the will of the Real Audiencia of Manila.

On July 22, 1759, the new Archbishop of Manila Manuel Rojo del Rio y Vieyra arrived in the country which made the occupation of de Ezpeleta to the gubernatorial seat void. De Ezpeleta refused to step down as governor after Rojo's orders. De Ezpeleta sought the support from the oidores of the Audiencia: two of the four oidores went to the side of de Ezpeleta while the other to Rojo. De Ezpeleta also raised the precedent of Juan Arrechedera, who previously had the same instance as him. They brought the question to the Council of the Indies through its prosecutor Francisco Léandro de Viana.

Administration
One of his initial actions against the previous administration of Arandía and the Real Audiencia was to revoke the reforms and decrees written by the ex-governor.

Later in 1759, he suppressed the armada of Fr. José Ducós, which was commissioned by Arandía to protect the Jesuit missionaries converting Muslims in Iligan Bay. One of the reasons of this suppression is that the Augustinian missionaries in Caraga and Butuan filed a complaint to de Ezpeleta that they are not well protected. Spanish historian and biographer José Montero y Vidal pointed out that this suppression greatly accelerated the depredations caused by Muslim pirates in Luzon and Visayas.

Much of de Ezpeleta's administration was occupied by the prosecution of don Santiago Orendaín, former adviser of governor Arandía who was held responsible for the repression of the church. Orendaín sought refuge in an Augustinian convent but was later seized and imprisoned in Fort Santiago.

In July 1761, a royal decree from Charles III of Spain coming from Madrid ordered the stepping down of de Ezpeleta. He then gave the administration of the colony to Archbishop Rojo.

References

Citations

Sources

 Bishop Miguel Lino de Ezpeleta †
 Díaz-Trechuelo, Lourdes. Legazpi y la integración de Filipinas en el imperio español de ultramar
 Governors of the Philippines during the Spanish colonial period
 Manchado López, Marta María. Las relaciones entre la autoridad civil y las órdenes religiosas en Filipinas durante el gobierno de don Pedro Manuel de Arandía
 Cunningham, Charles Henry. The audiencia in the Spanish colonies as illustrated by the audiencia of Malina (1583-1800), 1919.
 Bernad, Miguel Anselmo. The great island: studies in the exploration and evangelization of Mindanao, 2004.

1701 births
1771 deaths
18th-century Roman Catholic bishops in the Philippines
People from Intramuros
Captains General of the Philippines
Roman Catholic bishops of Cebu